Laura Jones is a Canadian teacher, economist and business activist. She is a contributor to the libertarian think tank, The Fraser Institute. She writes on a variety of issues and is published in the Fraser Forum, the monthly peer reviewed journal published by the Institute. Jones is the Director of the Centre for Studies in Risk and Regulation at The Fraser Institute. She received her M.A. in Economics from Simon Fraser University located in Vancouver, British Columbia, Canada.

Career
Jones is Vice-President of the Canadian Federation of Independent Business. Since joining CFIB in 2003, Jones has spearheaded a number of high-profile campaigns on behalf of small businesses, including CFIB’s annual 'Red Tape Awareness Week' and the ‘Park the Tax’ campaign that convinced the BC government to get rid of a new property tax on parking in the Lower Mainland.

Prior to joining CFIB she was Director of Environment and Regulatory Studies at The Fraser Institute and taught economics at the British Columbia Institute of Technology.

She has authored or co-authored a number of public policy studies including, Canada’s Regulatory Burden, Searching For Solutions: Experiments in Fisheries Management on Canada’s West Coast, and Environmental Indicators. She has edited five books including, Safe Enough? Managing Risk and Regulation. Jones has also published articles in the prominent Canadian newspapers, the Vancouver Sun, the Ottawa Citizen, and the National Post and testified before Parliamentary and Congressional committees on proposed legislation. She has also co-ordinated The Fraser Institute’s annual survey of mining companies. One prominent governmental advisory committee Jones co-chaired was the Paperwork Burden Reduction Initiativewhich was instrumental in streamlining new technologies in the day-to-day business within Industry Canada.

She received her B.A. in Economics from Mount Holyoke College in Massachusetts, and her M.A. in Economics from Simon Fraser University in British Columbia.
Jones' work is centered upon conservative principles and writes widely on the topic of Free market environmentalism. In an article titled "A Different Kind of Environmentalist",  Jones outlines some of the main supporting arguments behind the free market approach to solving environmental problems.

She writes,
A critical difference between standard environmentalists and free-market environmentalists is the view each group holds about economic growth. The standard view is that growth is destructive because producing more causes more pollution. In a static world, this is
true. But the world is dynamic, and two strong forces counteract the producemore-pollute-more effect. First, the increased income that is generated when more goods and services are produced drives a demand for more environmental quality. Once per-capita incomes cover basic food and shelter requirements, cleaner air and water become priorities. This explains why some of the richest countries in the world, like Canada and the US, are also the cleanest. Second, economic growth stimulates innovation. Since newer technology tends to be both more efficient and cleaner, it improves environmental quality".

This is a widely held view amongst more popular and world-renowned free market environmentalists like Terry L. Anderson, Donald Leal and Elizabeth Brubaker.

References
 

Academic staff of the British Columbia Institute of Technology
Living people
Canadian economists
Canadian women economists
Canadian libertarians
Year of birth missing (living people)
Mount Holyoke College alumni